Dillenia reticulata is a deciduous rainforest tree in the family Dilleniaceae. It is native to the Malay Peninsula, Borneo and Sumatra.

Description
The underside of the leaves is fuzzy. The flowers are five-petaled, yellow and about eight centimeters (three inches) in width. The trees have prop roots similar to those of mangroves.

References

reticulata
Plants described in 1889
Flora of Peninsular Malaysia
Flora of Borneo
Flora of Sumatra
Flora of Singapore